William Charles Dement (July 29, 1928 – June 17, 2020) was an American sleep researcher and founder of the Sleep Research Center at Stanford University. He was a leading authority on sleep, sleep deprivation and the diagnosis and treatment of sleep disorders such as sleep apnea and narcolepsy. For this pioneering work in a previously uncharted field in the United States, he is sometimes referred to as the American father of sleep medicine.

Biography
Dement was born in Wenatchee, Washington, in 1928. In the 1950s, of those who also studied at the University of Chicago he was the first to intensively study the connection between rapid eye movement and dreaming.  His fellow student Eugene Aserinsky had mentioned to him that "Dr. Kleitman and I think these eye movements might be related to dreaming".  Aserinsky, along with his and Dement's adviser Nathaniel Kleitman, had previously noticed the connection but hadn't considered it very interesting.  Dement had an interest in psychiatry, which in those days considered dreams to be important, so he was excited by the discovery and was eager to pursue it. From the University of Chicago, he received an MD in 1955 and a PhD in neurophysiology in 1957 for the thesis Rapid eye movements during sleep in schizophrenics and non-schizophrenics and their relation to dream recall supervised by Kleitman.

He began his work in sleep deprivation at Mount Sinai Hospital in the late 1950s – the early 1960s. In 1964, he monitored and assisted Randy Gardner's successful attempt to break the record for longest time without sleep. He was among the first researchers to study sleeping subjects with the electroencephalogram (EEG), and he wrote "I believe that the study of sleep became a true scientific field in 1953, when I finally was able to make all-night, continuous recordings of brain and eye activity during sleep."  Studying these recordings, he discovered and named the five stages of sleep.  In collaboration with Dr. Christian Guilleminault, Dement proposed the measure that is still used for the clinical definition of sleep apnea and the rating of its severity, the Apnea Hypopnea Index (AHI).

Dement, professor of psychiatry and behavioral sciences at Stanford University School of Medicine, taught the large and popular "Sleep and Dreams" course at Stanford, which started in 1971.

In 1975 he launched the American Sleep Disorders Association, now known as the American Academy of Sleep Medicine, and served as president for its first twelve years.  In that same year he and Mary Carskadon invented the Multiple Sleep Latency Test used to measure sleepiness, a test of how quickly people fall asleep, sleep onset latency, during several daytime opportunities.

He was also chairman of the National Commission on Sleep Disorders Research, whose final report led directly to the creation of a new agency within the National Institutes of Health, the National Center on Sleep Disorders Research.

Dement was the author of The Promise of Sleep and The Sleepwatchers, and wrote the first undergraduate textbook in the field..  The Promise of Sleep was featured in the 2012 independent comedy film Sleepwalk with Me, and Dement also made a cameo appearance in the film.

At the start of his academic career, he was a jazz musician and played bass. While at the University of Washington, he played with Quincy Jones, a time during which he also befriended Ray Charles. During the late 1980s, while at Stanford, he was known to have played, on at least one occasion, with artist-in-residence, Stan Getz.

He lived with his family in northern California. Dement died in Stanford, California, on June 17, 2020, from cardiovascular disease at the age of 91.

Selected publications

See also
Sleep
Sleep disorder
Sleep onset latency

References

External links
Stanford School of Medicine profile 
The Sleep Well
Sleep Quest

1928 births
2020 deaths
Sleep researchers
Stanford University School of Medicine faculty
University of Washington alumni
University of Chicago alumni
American psychiatrists
People from Wenatchee, Washington
Physicians from Washington (state)
20th-century American physicians
21st-century American physicians
Members of the National Academy of Medicine